Ma Rainey's Black Bottom is a 2020 American drama film directed by George C. Wolfe and written by Ruben Santiago-Hudson, based on the 1982 play of the same name by August Wilson. The film stars Viola Davis, Chadwick Boseman, Glynn Turman, Colman Domingo, and Michael Potts. Inspired by the career of Ma Rainey, an influential blues singer and the title character, the film dramatizes a turbulent recording session in 1920s Chicago.

Produced by Denzel Washington, Todd Black, and Dany Wolf, the project was originally announced alongside Washington's Fences in 2013 as part of his ten-picture deal with HBO. The adaptation eventually moved to Netflix and filming began in Pittsburgh in 2019. Boseman died during post-production in August 2020, making Black Bottom his final film appearance. The film is dedicated to his memory.

Ma Rainey's Black Bottom began a limited theatrical release on November 25, 2020, before beginning to stream on Netflix on December 18. The film received universal acclaim. Critics lauded the performances of Davis, Boseman, and Turman as well as the costume design and production values. It was named as one of the ten best films of 2020 by the American Film Institute. The film received five nominations at the 93rd Academy Awards, including Best Actor (for Boseman), Best Actress (for Davis), and won two awards: Makeup and Hairstyling and Costume Design. Additionally, the film received eight Critics' Choice Movie Award nominations and nine NAACP Image Award nominations, including Outstanding Motion Picture, with Davis and Boseman both winning lead acting awards. Davis and Boseman also won lead acting awards for their performances at the Screen Actors Guild Awards, making history as the first Black actors to win in leading categories in the same year; both received nominations at the Golden Globes, with Boseman posthumously winning Best Actor – Motion Picture Drama.

Plot
Ma Rainey is a highly regarded, strong-willed blues singer who has recently been contracted by white producers. The story takes place on July 2, 1927, when a recording session is scheduled for Ma by her manager Irvin to take place at Paramount's Recording Studios in Chicago. Seasoned Georgia Jazz Band members Toledo, Cutler, and Slow Drag arrive on time without Ma which frustrates her producer, Mel Sturdyvant. They are soon joined by Levee Green, the band's overconfident trumpeter, who has shown Sturdyvant his original compositions in the hopes of breaking away from Ma and getting his own record deal. The rest of the band disapproves of this.  Teased by the rest of the band about his ability to deal with white men, Levee relates how his mother was gang-raped by white men.  His father exacted revenge on the assailants, killing four of them before being lynched and then burned.

Ma arrives an hour late with her lady friend, Dussie Mae, and her nephew, Sylvester. Immediately, she clashes with Sturdyvant and her manager Irvin, making numerous demands. Insulted that the Coca-Cola she requested has not been provided, Ma refuses to begin the recording session; assigning Slow Drag and Sylvester to get her one. Later, she insists to Sturdyvant that the opening words of the album be spoken by Sylvester, who has a pronounced stutter. As a result, the group has to do multiple takes of the song “Ma Rainey’s Black Bottom," much to everyone's frustration.

Ma confides to Cutler that her white bosses are only interested in her voice, and would otherwise regard her as  "just a dog in the alley" which he understands and sympathizes with. Meanwhile, Levee and Dussie Mae have sex in the practice room before being interrupted by Slow Drag.

The group finally manages to get through the first track after multiple takes, but discovers an equipment failure has caused it not to be recorded. 
The band blames Levee, who they think tripped over a wire while eyeing Dussie Mae, though it is revealed to have been damaged already. Their argument leads the religious Cutler to tell a story about a preacher he once knew who got stranded in a small town and was humiliated by a group of white men who tore up his Bible and forced him to dance. Levee brushes off the story; saying that if there was a God, he would care for black people, which He never has. Cutler attacks Levee in anger, leading Levee to pull out a knife in retaliation while still mocking Cutler and his beliefs.

The group finally finishes recording, but Ma fires Levee soon afterward; believing his reckless ambition and uncompromising attitude to be detrimental to the band. Levee meets with Sturdyvant about his original songs, but discovers that he will only purchase the songs; insisting that there is no market for them. Levee suffers a mental breakdown and, after Toledo accidentally steps on his new shoes, Levee fatally stabs him in the back with the knife. Cutler and Slow Drag leave in horror as a regretful Levee cradles Toledo's corpse. Later, Sturdyvant records Levee's songs with a band consisting entirely of white musicians (supposedly Paul Whiteman's Orchestra).

Cast
 Chadwick Boseman as Levee Green
 Viola Davis as Ma Rainey
 Maxayn Lewis as Ma's singing voice.
 Glynn Turman as Toledo
 Colman Domingo as Cutler
 Michael Potts as Slow Drag
 Jonny Coyne as Mel Sturdyvant
 Taylour Paige as Dussie Mae
 Jeremy Shamos as Irvin
 Dusan Brown as Sylvester
 Joshua Harto as Policeman
 Quinn VanAntwerp as Band Singer

Production
Denzel Washington initially had a deal with the television network HBO to produce nine of the playwright August Wilson's plays into films, with Ma Rainey's Black Bottom among them. By June 2019, the deal had been moved to Netflix. Viola Davis, Chadwick Boseman, Glynn Turman, Colman Domingo, and Michael Potts had been cast in the film, with George C. Wolfe set to direct. In July 2019, Taylour Paige, Jonny Coyne, Jeremy Shamos, and Dusan Brown joined the cast of the film. Maxayn Lewis did most of Rainey's singing for Davis. Jeffrey Wright was originally expected to join the film.

Filming commenced on July 8, 2019 in Pittsburgh, with sets converted into 1927 Chicago, and wrapped on August 16, 2019.

On August 28, 2020, Boseman died of colon cancer during post-production, making Ma Rainey's Black Bottom his final film appearance. The film is dedicated to him.

Release
The film was theatrically released in select theaters on November 25, 2020, before beginning to stream on December 18, on Netflix. Netflix also released a 31-minute making-of documentary Ma Rainey's Black Bottom: A Legacy Brought to Screen alongside the film. Upon its digital release to Netflix, the film was the most-watched item over its opening weekend.

Reception

Critical response 

On Rotten Tomatoes, the film holds an approval rating of 97% based on 301 reviews, with an average rating of 8.2/10. The website's critics consensus reads: "Framed by a pair of powerhouse performances, Ma Rainey's Black Bottom pays affectionate tribute to a blues legend — and Black culture at large." According to Metacritic, which compiled 46 reviews and calculated a weighted average score of 87 out of 100, the film received "universal acclaim".

For the Los Angeles Times, Justin Chang wrote "Boseman, evincing the same integrity he clung to his entire career, refuses to soft-pedal the destination. He imparts to this seething, shattered man the gift of a broken soul, driven by anger and trauma, and makes him all the more human for it. His final moments of screen time are among his darkest, and also his finest." Eric Kohn of IndieWire gave the film a "B" grade and praised Boseman and Davis's performances, saying: "All of this would be more concerning if Ma Rainey's Black Bottom didn't turn on Wilson's crackling dialogue and a jazzy pace on par with the music. Above all, the movie amounts to a solid resurrection that doesn't muck up the bulk of what made the play click in the first place."

Peter Travers, reviewing the film for ABC News, said: "Davis plays the real-life Ma Rainey, the Georgia singer dubbed the Mother of the Blues. Boseman invests body and soul into Levee, the hot-headed trumpeter who dares to lock horns with Ma in a shabby Chicago recording studio where they're paid to make music the way the white bosses want it. The time is 1927, but the bristling racial tensions feel as timely as ever."

Accolades

References

External links
 
 
 
 "Ma Rainey's Black Bottom" - lyrics

2020 biographical drama films
2020 LGBT-related films
2020s American films
2020s English-language films
African-American biographical dramas
African-American LGBT-related films
African-American films
American films based on plays
American biographical drama films
Biographical films about LGBT people
Biographical films about singers
Black people in art
Blues films
Cultural depictions of American women
Cultural depictions of blues musicians
Escape Artists films
2020 independent films
English-language Netflix original films
Female bisexuality in film
Films directed by George C. Wolfe
Films produced by Denzel Washington
Films set in 1927
Films set in Chicago
Films shot in Pittsburgh
Films that won the Academy Award for Best Makeup
Films that won the Best Costume Design Academy Award
LGBT-related drama films